Tonlé San, also known as Tonlé Se San or Sesan River, is a river that flows through central Vietnam and north-east Cambodia. It is a major tributary of the Mekong River. A short portion of the river forms a part of the international border between Cambodia and Vietnam.

There are a number of hydropower dams on the Se San River and its tributaries. Where it joins the Srepok River in the Lower Se San 2 Dam. Upstream is the dam cascade: Se San 4A, Se San 4, Se San 3A, Se San 3, Yali Falls. On the Dak Po Ko River is the Plei Krông dam. There are also several dams on tributaries of the Dak Bla, incl the Dak Snghé, tributary of the Dak Bla, is the Upper Kontum dam and hydropower plant, which discharges into the Tra Khuc River, and the Dak Doa.

External links
Location in Google Maps

References 

Rivers of Cambodia
Rivers of Gia Lai province
Rivers of Kon Tum province
International rivers of Asia
Cambodia–Vietnam border
Tributaries of the Mekong River
Rivers of Vietnam